German Airways Fluggesellschaft GmbH, operating as German Airways and formerly named Luftfahrtgesellschaft Walter or LGW for short, was a German regional airline headquartered in Düsseldorf.

Originally LGW was an independent provider of scheduled and chartered low-volume passenger flights. After years of cooperation with Air Berlin, it eventually became a subsidiary of Air Berlin in 2017. After the collapse of Air Berlin it was purchased by Lufthansa in October 2017 and became a unit of the group's low-cost carrier Eurowings. Zeitfracht Group completed the purchase of LGW from Lufthansa on 1 April 2019 and renamed it in early 2020. The contract with Eurowings was terminated in April 2020 and LGW filed for insolvency.

History

Independent company
Luftfahrtgesellschaft Walter was founded in 1980 by Bernd Walter, the owner of a flying school at Dortmund Airport. Initially, LGW offered on-demand charter and air taxi services. During the 1990s, the airline grew a network of scheduled domestic flights. At that time, it had 25 employees and the Dornier 228, with its capacity of 19 passengers, was the largest airliner in its fleet.

Partnership with Air Berlin
In 2007, LGW entered into a partnership with Air Berlin, which at the time was the second largest German airline. Effective 12 October of that year, LGW flights to Düsseldorf Airport and Berlin Tegel Airport were sold via the Air Berlin booking engine. In 2008, Air Berlin added the De Havilland Dash 8-400 to its fleet. The ten aircraft of that type were leased to LGW and operated on regional routes.

Subsequently, LGW discontinued its independent corporate identity. It no longer offered any chartered services, but operated scheduled flights on behalf of Air Berlin, using Air Berlin flight numbers and branding. The website lgw.de was shut down and replaced with a redirect to airberlin.com. On 2 March 2009, Air Berlin notified the Federal Cartel Office that it would become the controlling shareholder of LGW.

As LGW staff did not have a collective agreement, salaries were considerably lower than at Air Berlin. To cut costs, Air Berlin transferred a large number of its staff to LGW (especially those whose fixed-term contracts had expired). By the end of 2011, LGW had 110 employees. By early 2013, they had grown to 480. Since that year, LGW also employed jet pilots, as a number of Embraer 190 aircraft were transferred to the airline from Niki (another Air Berlin subsidiary), the first of which arrived on 14 March and left the fleet in November 2013.

By spring 2015, LGW increased their fleet of De Havilland Dash 8-400s from 12 to 17.

In May 2017, Air Berlin announced plans to buy Luftfahrtgesellschaft Walter outright, having held a controlling stake since 2009.

Sale to Lufthansa
Lufthansa bought LGW in 2017 as part of Air Berlin's bankruptcy proceedings. After Air Berlin ceased operations on 27 October 2017, LGW started wetlease operations for Eurowings, taking over parts of the wetlease agreement previously provided by its parent for the Lufthansa subsidiary. In addition to its existing fleet of Dash 8-Q400 aircraft, it received 13 Airbus A320-family aircraft and started hiring crews in November 2017. The acquisition was closed in January 2018 after receiving approval from the European Commission on 21 December 2017.

In late 2018, all LGW Airbus A320 family aircraft were moved to other companies within the Eurowings network.

Sale to Zeitfracht Group and rebranding
In January 2019, it was reported that Lufthansa planned to sell LGW to Zeitfracht, which already owns German ACMI and charter airline German Airways (formerly branded WDL Aviation). Zeitfracht had already purchased parts of Air Berlin's maintenance division.  The deal was completed on 1 April 2019, following the approval of supervisory authorities and the fulfillment of customary conditions. The takeover also marked the beginning of a longer-term lease agreement between LGW and Eurowings.

In May 2019, LGW announced it would replace all of its De Havilland Dash 8-400s with newer Embraer 190s from late 2019. These aircraft will be operated for Eurowings as part of a long-term lease.

In March 2020, Zeitfracht announced a rebranding for LGW which is to become German Airways operating within the German Airways branding alongside sister company WDL Aviation. In April 2020, the company filed for insolvency with plans to restructure due to the cancellation of Eurowings' wetlease contract for their entire Bombardier DHC-8-400 fleet in the wake of the COVID-19 pandemic.

Destinations
As of January 2019, German Airways operated European routes on behalf of Eurowings with a focus on Düsseldorf Airport, where most aircraft were based. This contract was terminated in April 2020.

Fleet

Current fleet

As of September 2021, the joint German Airways fleet consisted of the following aircraft:

Historical fleet
Previously, LGW operated the following aircraft types under its own brand or on behalf of other airlines:

References

External links

Defunct airlines of Germany
Airlines established in 1980
Airlines disestablished in 2020
1980 establishments in West Germany
Companies based in North Rhine-Westphalia
Companies based in Düsseldorf
Lufthansa
German companies disestablished in 2020
German companies established in 1980